Charles Sumner (1811–1874) was American politician from Massachusetts.

Charles Sumner is also the name of:

 Charles Sumner (bishop) (1790–1874), English bishop
 Charles A. Sumner (1835–1903), U.S. Representative from California
 Charles Burt Sumner (1837–1927), Congregational minister and founding trustee of Pomona College
 Charles K. Sumner (1874–1948), American architect
 Charles Sumner, birth name of Howard Hall (actor) (1867–1921), American actor and writer
 Charlie Sumner (politician) (1867–1925), British politician and trade unionist
 Charlie Sumner (1930–2015), American football player